Wests Bulldogs may refer to:

Western Bulldogs, club in the Australian Football League
Wests Rugby, club in the Queensland Premier Rugby competition
Western Districts Australian Football Club, which used to compete in the AFL Queensland State League